The Diocese of Tabora is a central diocese in the Anglican Church of Tanzania: its current bishop is the Rt Revd Elias Chakupewa.

Notes

Anglican Church of Tanzania dioceses
Tabora Region
Anglican realignment dioceses